Triplophysa moquensis is a species of ray-finned fish in the genus Triplophysa. It is endemic to Xiaman Lake, Sichuan, although it might occur more widely.

Footnotes 

M
Freshwater fish of China
Endemic fauna of Sichuan
Taxa named by Ding Rui-Hua
Fish described in 1994